Matagorda is a census-designated place in Matagorda County, Texas. It is located near the mouth of the Colorado River on the upper Texas coast in the United States. In 2020, its population was 313. Matagorda is primarily a tourist town, with commercial and recreational fishing being the top industries. About  of the beach are accessible by vehicle and 35 additional miles are accessible only by boat. Matagorda is at the end of State Highway 60 and the beginning of Farm to Market Road 2031, which runs over the Intracoastal Waterway and south to the Gulf of Mexico.

History
Matagorda is the third-oldest Anglo-American town in Texas. It was established in 1827 when Stephen F. Austin obtained permission from the Mexican government to build a town to protect incoming settlers. Elias R. Wightman, who was one of Stephen F. Austin's early surveyors, traveled to Matagorda in 1829 with 60 immigrant settlers.

Twenty-four historical markers are in the township of Matagorda.

Demographics 

As of the 2020 United States census, there were 313 people, 242 households, and 167 families residing in the CDP.

Activities

Tourist activities in Matagorda include visiting the beach. The area is a common fishing spot on the Texas coast. It provides access to both East and West Matagorda Bays, Matagorda Beach, and the Gulf of Mexico.

Other activities include kayaking and kayak fishing, due to miles of shallow marsh area only accessible by kayak. Miles of designated paddling trails is in the Matagorda area.

Matagorda County has been number-one in the nation since 1997 in the North American Audubon Christmas Bird Count with 234 different species spotted. Among the species reported are the prairie warbler, common poorwill, broad-winged hawk, MacGillivray's warbler, and Swainson's warbler.

Education
Matagorda Independent School District is the local K-8 school district.

The designated community college for Matagorda Independent School District is Wharton County Junior College.

References

External links

 
 Matagorda Beach information
 Matagorda Beach Cam
 Matagorda Chamber of Commerce

Census-designated places in Matagorda County, Texas
Populated coastal places in Texas
1827 establishments in Texas